'Crimson Gold' is a modern cultivar of applecrab, meaning that it is a cross between a crabapple and a domesticated apple. It is a small apple.

It is one of the last apples to be developed by the American breeder Albert Etter in 1944, who named it 'Little Rosybloom'. Etter died in 1950 before completing the patent filing, and it was later rediscovered and renamed as 'Crimson Gold'.

The skin of 'Crimson Gold' has a yellow background which is visual only at the shaded areas of the skin and around the stem. Otherwise it is covered with a ruby red. Flesh is crisp, with a balance of sweet and tart. Delicious for fresh eating, and also good for baking, retains its shape and texture even with high temperature. In fact, when the apple was rediscovered, about 1970, on a single limb of an old test orchard, Etter's "boil test" was used to confirm that the found apple was in fact Crimson Gold/Little Rosybloom. The genuine apple holds its shape after 2 hours of boiling, while the similar Wickson Crab, also an Etter introduction, does not.

Things became confused when "Svatava" a totally different, modern, variety from Europe, was introduced under the same name, "Crimson(r) Gold". The new introduction was trademarked in the US by Brandt's Fruit Trees, so now the "original" Crimson Gold is again being called Little Rosybloom, although a few, wholesale, specialty fruit distribution companies continue to promote the original as Crimson Gold. Both apples are grown in very small volumes, and are mostly grown by home growers, or small direct retail orchards. The Crimson(r) Gold is a registered trademark of Brandt's Fruit Trees and permission must be given in order for the trademark to be used with the Svatava cultivar.

References

External links
The mysteries behind the Crimson Gold apple
Apple Variety List
Shockingly Delicious

Apple cultivars